Johanna Suzanna Oosterhuis-van der Stok (1910-1989) was a Dutch ceramist.

Biography 
Oosterhuis-van der Stok née Stok was born on 17 July 1910 in The Hague. She attended the Akademie van beeldende kunsten (Royal Academy of Art, The Hague). She traveled to London and Paris where she studied with André Lhote. She was married to J.H. Oosterhuis.
Her work was included in the 1939 exhibition and sale Onze Kunst van Heden (Our Art of Today) at the Rijksmuseum in Amsterdam. She was a member of the Pulchri Studio in The Hague.

Oosterhuis-van der Stok died on 29 August 1989 in Amersfoort.

References

1910 births 
1989 deaths
Artists from The Hague
20th-century Dutch women artists